Tina is a village in northeast Carroll County, Missouri, United States. The population was 139 at the 2020 census.

History
Tina was laid out in 1892, and named after Tina Gilchrist, the daughter of a railroad official. A post office called Tina has been in operation since 1884.

Geography
Tina is located at  (39.537717, -93.439445).

Demographics

2010 census
As of the census of 2010, there were 157 people, 60 households, and 47 families living in the village. The racial makeup of the village was 98.1% White and 1.9% from two or more races.

There were 60 households, of which 35.0% had children under the age of 18 living with them, 61.7% were married couples living together, 11.7% had a female householder with no husband present, 5.0% had a male householder with no wife present, and 21.7% were non-families. 20.0% of all households were made up of individuals, and 6.6% had someone living alone who was 65 years of age or older. The average household size was 2.62 and the average family size was 2.91.

The median age in the village was 39.5 years. 26.1% of residents were under the age of 18; 4.5% were between the ages of 18 and 24; 24.2% were from 25 to 44; 30% were from 45 to 64; and 15.3% were 65 years of age or older. The gender makeup of the village was 50.3% male and 49.7% female.

2000 census

As of the census of 2000, there were 193 people, 72 households, and 56 families living in the village. The population density was 557.1 people per square mile (212.9/km). There were 81 housing units at an average density of 233.8 per square mile (89.4/km). The racial makeup of the village was 99.48% White, and 0.52% from two or more races.

There were 72 households, out of which 34.7% had children under the age of 18 living with them, 65.3% were married couples living together, 6.9% had a female householder with no husband present, and 22.2% were non-families. 22.2% of all households were made up of individuals, and 15.3% had someone living alone who was 65 years of age or older. The average household size was 2.68 and the average family size was 3.07.

In the village, the population was spread out, with 29.0% under the age of 18, 8.8% from 18 to 24, 25.4% from 25 to 44, 18.1% from 45 to 64, and 18.7% who were 65 years of age or older. The median age was 37 years. For every 100 females, there were 89.2 males. For every 100 females age 18 and over, there were 87.7 males.

The median income for a household in the village was $29,167, and the median income for a family was $34,643. Males had a median income of $26,250 versus $21,042 for females. The per capita income for the village was $11,485. About 5.4% of families and 8.9% of the population were below the poverty line, including 3.6% of those under the age of eighteen and 13.2% of those 65 or over.

References

External links
 Historic maps of Tina in the Sanborn Maps of Missouri Collection at the University of Missouri

Villages in Carroll County, Missouri
Villages in Missouri